Alan Williams (17 December 1917 – 6 November 1988) was an Australian rules footballer who played for Collingwood in the Victorian Football League (VFL).

Williams was tried in many roles at Collingwood, initially in the ruck where he played in their losing 1938 Grand Final team. He participated in another Grand Final loss the following season, this time as a centre half back. In 1940 he kicked a career high 23 goals and his VFL career ended in disappointment when Collingwood were knocked out of the 1945 finals series. Despite leaving Collingwood, Williams continued playing football with Williamstown, which he captained-coached.

References

Holmesby, Russell and Main, Jim (2007). The Encyclopedia of AFL Footballers. 7th ed. Melbourne: Bas Publishing.

1917 births
Australian rules footballers from Victoria (Australia)
Collingwood Football Club players
Williamstown Football Club players
Williamstown Football Club coaches
Chelsea Football Club (Australia) players
1988 deaths